Stephen Andrew Faulkner (born 18 December 1954, in Sheffield) is an English former footballer who played in the Football League as a central defender for Sheffield United, Stockport County and York City. He then moved into non-league football with Frickley Athletic.

References

External links
 

1954 births
Living people
Footballers from Sheffield
English footballers
Association football defenders
Sheffield United F.C. players
Stockport County F.C. players
York City F.C. players
Frickley Athletic F.C. players
English Football League players